Shelley Oates-Wilding (born 4 July 1965) is an Australian sprint canoeist and waterman who competed for Australia in Canoeing from 1989 to 2008 (over a decade). Competing in two Summer Olympics, she earned her best finish of eighth in the K-4 500 m event at Atlanta in 1996.

She held an Australian Institute of Sport netball scholarship from 1984 to 1988. A serious knee injury resulted in her taking up canoeing. She held an AIS sprint canoeing scholarship in 1990–1996.

She won the World Championships Surf Ski (Surf Life Saving) in Japan in 1992 and went on to win several Outrigger World Championships in Hawaii (Na Wahine O Ke Kai) with Offshore (Cal), Riggeroos (Aus), and Team Bradley (Hawaii). 

Oates competed in the Gladiator Individual Sports Athletes Challenge in 1995.

She currently resides in Hawaii as president of  Ikaika Hawaii, A Watermans Academy (Non Profit). Her work now is in educating our next generation in Ocean Safety and Stewardship as well as coaching and supporting others wanting to explore their abilities and the ocean.

References

External links
Sports-Reference.com profile
Ikaika Hawaii, A Watermans Academy

1965 births
Australian female canoeists
Canoeists at the 1996 Summer Olympics
Canoeists at the 2000 Summer Olympics
Living people
Olympic canoeists of Australia
Australian Institute of Sport canoeists
Australian Institute of Sport netball players
Australian netball players
Esso/Mobil Superleague players